Nathan Ahimbisibwe  is an Anglican bishop in Uganda: he has been  Bishop of South Ankole since 2012.

Ahimbisibwe was educated at the Reformed Theological Seminary and ordained in 1997. He has served as a lecturer at Bishop Stuart University,  Tutor of Theological Education  in the Diocese of Ankole, Chaplain of  Makerere University and as a Canon of St. Peter's Cathedral, Bweranyangi. He was consecrated at St. Matthew's Church, Kyamate on January 8, 2012.

References

Reformed Theological Seminary alumni
Anglican bishops of South Ankole
21st-century Anglican bishops in Uganda
Bishop Stuart University alumni
Living people
People associated with Makerere University
Year of birth missing (living people)